In geometric topology, a field within mathematics, the obstruction to a finitely dominated space X being homotopy-equivalent to a finite CW-complex is its Wall finiteness obstruction w(X) which is an element in the reduced zeroth algebraic K-theory  of the integral group ring . It is named after the mathematician C. T. C. Wall.

By work of John Milnor on finitely dominated spaces, no generality is lost in letting X be a CW-complex. A finite domination of X is a finite CW-complex K together with maps  and  such that . By a construction due to Milnor it is possible to extend r to a homotopy equivalence  where  is a CW-complex obtained from K by attaching cells to kill the relative homotopy groups . 

The space  will be finite if all relative homotopy groups are finitely generated. Wall showed that this will be the case if and only if his finiteness obstruction vanishes. Wall then showed that the cellular chain complex  is chain-homotopy equivalent to a chain complex  of finite type of projective -modules, and that  will be finitely generated if and only if these modules are stably-free. Stably-free modules vanish in reduced K-theory. This motivates the definition

.

See also
Algebraic K-theory
Whitehead torsion

References

.
.

Geometric topology
Algebraic K-theory
Surgery theory